District School 4 is a historic one room school building located at Coventry in Chenango County, New York. It is a -story, wood-frame building on a cut-stone foundation built about 1900.  It is four bays wide and three bays deep with a broad gable roof.

It was added to the National Register of Historic Places in 2004.

References

School buildings on the National Register of Historic Places in New York (state)
School buildings completed in 1900
One-room schoolhouses in New York (state)
Schoolhouses in the United States
Buildings and structures in Chenango County, New York
National Register of Historic Places in Chenango County, New York
1900 establishments in New York (state)